Randalummoodu is a village situated near Kottarakkara in Kollam District, Kerala state, India.

Politics
Randalummoodu is a part of Pathanapuram assembly constituency in Mavelikkara (Lok Sabha constituency). Shri. K. B. Ganesh Kumar is the current MLA of Pathanpuram. Shri.Kodikkunnil Suresh is the current member of parliament of Mavelikkara.

Geography
Randalummoodu is a small village in Thalavoor panchayats. Randalummodu is junction in Pathanapuram-Kottarakkara (via Kura) road. It connects places Kura, etc. Randalummoodu junction is a main part of Randalummodu

References

Geography of Kollam district
Villages in Kollam district